The Afro-Arts Theater was a regional theater on Chicago's South Side. Established in 1967, by Kelan Philip Cohran. It was a meeting place for Black Power Activists  and established itself as a central figure of the growing African American consciousness in Chicago. On December 28, 1969, the Afro-Arts Theater on Chicago's South Side, Gwendolyn Brooks received what she considers the most stirring and significant tribute of her life.

References 

Theatre companies in Chicago
Regional theatre in the United States
Political theatre companies
Arts organizations established in 1967